Frederick William Richmond (November 15, 1923 – December 28, 2019) was an American politician who served as a Democratic four-term member of the United States House of Representatives from New York from 1975 to 1982.

Early life
Richmond was born in Boston, Massachusetts, to Frances (née Rosen) and George Richmond; his father was a lawyer and his mother a homemaker. He graduated from Roxbury Memorial High School in 1940 and enrolled at Boston University for a year before transferring to Harvard University, where he majored in history and served as advertising manager of The Harvard Lampoon. During World War II, he served in the United States Navy from 1943 to 1945 before returning to Boston University, where he received his undergraduate degree in 1946. In college, he supported himself by playing the piano and forming the Freddie Richmond Swing Band.

Politics
He served as deputy finance chairman of the Democratic National Committee from 1958 until 1960 and was a delegate to the 1964 Democratic National Convention. He was also member of the New York City Council from 1973 until 1974 when he was elected to the US Congress in 1974 and represented New York's 14th congressional district from January 3, 1975, until August 25, 1982.

Upon his election, Richmond joined the House Agriculture Committee where he spent many years to develop new support for federally funded inner city gardens which he hoped would spread across the nation. Due to his work, and with help from House veterans in Congress like Jamie Whitten, the Urban Gardening Program (UGP) was created.

Business
From the 1950s to the 1980s he built a conglomerate, incorporated in 1960 as Walco National, buying up and usually improving the operations of a diverse group of smaller operating companies. His business career was not without notoriety. Richmond was also known as an opportunist who skirted ethics. In one instance, he was accused of involvement in greenmail, the purchase of strategic blocks of shares for resale back to a target for a profit.

Personal
In April 1978, Richmond was arrested in Washington for soliciting sex from a 16-year-old boy.

In 1982, Richmond was convicted on federal corruption charges, which included possession of marijuana and payment of an illegal gratuity to a Brooklyn Navy Yard employee. He resigned his seat and was found guilty of making illegal payments to a government employee and marijuana possession. He was sentenced to a year and a day in federal prison and fined $20,000. He served nine months in prison.

With a personal fortune estimated at $32 million, Richmond was one of the wealthiest members of Congress.

Richmond died on December 28, 2019, at a nursing home in Manhattan from pneumonia, aged 96.

See also

 List of American federal politicians convicted of crimes
 List of federal political scandals in the United States
 List of federal political sex scandals in the United States
 List of Jewish members of the United States Congress

References

External links
 Retrieved on 2009-05-19.
"What's Really Wrong with Fred Richmond?", Jim Sleeper, Village Voice, March 30, 1982.
"The Rise and Fall of Fred Richmond", Pete Hamill and Denis Hamill, New York Magazine'', November 22, 1982.

|-

|-

1923 births
2019 deaths
20th-century American businesspeople
20th-century American politicians
20th-century American pianists
21st-century American Jews
American businesspeople convicted of crimes
American people convicted of drug offenses
American people convicted of tax crimes
American politicians convicted of bribery
Boston University alumni
Deaths from pneumonia in New York City
Democratic Party members of the United States House of Representatives from New York (state)
Jewish members of the United States House of Representatives
Military personnel from Massachusetts
New York (state) politicians convicted of crimes
New York City Council members
Politicians from Boston
Swing bandleaders
The Harvard Lampoon alumni
United States Navy personnel of World War II